Chrysopolominae is a subfamily of moths in the family Limacodidae. The type genus of this subfamily is Chrysopoloma. Chrysopolominae was originally a family (Chrysopolomidae) under the superfamily Zygaenoidea, consisting of two subfamilies, including about 30 species distributed in Africa, but in other newer documents, this family was downgraded and became It is a subfamily under Limacodidae, which belongs to the superfamily of Zygaenoidea, and the two subfamilies originally under Chrysopolominae were merged to become the synonym of Chrysopolominae called Ectropinae.

List of genera 
According to Afromoths.org, this taxon includes the following genera

 Achrocerides Hering, 1937
 Chrysectropa Bethune-Baker, 1911
 Chrysopoloma Druce, 1886
 Chrysopolomides Hering, 1937
 Diquishia Kurshakov & Zolotuhin, 2016
 Ectropa Wallengren, 1863
 Ectropona Kurshakov & Zolotuhin, 2013
 Erythropteryx Hering, 1937
 Hamartia Hering, 1937
 Scotinocerides Hering, 1937
 Strigivenifera Hering, 1937
 Vietteopoloma Hering, 1961

References 

Limacodidae
Moth subfamilies